Jetshen Dohna Lama is an Indian singer. She is one of the singers who participated in the Sa Re Ga Ma Pa L'il Champs 2022 on Zee TV show and also became the winner of Little Champs.

Early life and career 
Jetshen was nine years old when she was a contestant on the show, and she is from Sikkim. She studied at El Bethel Academy, Pakyong, Sikkim in Class 5.

Television

References

External links 

 Jetshen Dohna Lama at Instagram

Indian singers
People from Sikkim
Living people